Antiblemma subrutilans is a moth of the family Noctuidae. It is found in Ecuador and Costa Rica.

References

Moths described in 1858
Catocalinae
Moths of Central America
Moths of South America